is a 1951 black-and-white Japanese drama film directed by Kenji Mizoguchi. It is based on the 1932 novella The Reed Cutter (Ashikari)  by Jun'ichirō Tanizaki.

Plot
In 19th century Japan, Shinnosuke is paid a visit by Shizu and her sister Oyū to see if Shizu is a fitting marriage prospect for him. Yet, Shinnosuke is more fascinated by the older Oyū. Tradition forbids that the widowed Oyū marries again, as she has to raise her son and future heir of her deceased husband's family, so Shinnosuke and Shizu marry as a means for him and Oyū being as close as possible. When Oyū learns that Shizu declined to consummate the marriage as a sign of respect for the older sister and the affection between her and Shinnosuke, Oyū scolds her. Also, rumours about the true nature of the relationship between the three have started to spread, so Oyū insists on a geographical distance. Later, Oyū's son dies, and she has to leave her husband's family, while Shizu dies shortly after giving birth to her and Shinnosuke's child. Shinnosuke, whose family has lost its fortune, leaves his child at the house of the remarried Oyū, asking her in a letter to raise it as her own.

Cast
 Kinuyo Tanaka as Oyū Kayukawa
 Nobuko Otowa as Shizu
 Yūji Hori as Shinnosuke Seribashi
 Kiyoko Hirai as Osumi
 Reiko Kongo as Otsugi Kayukawa
 Eijirō Yanagi as Eitaro
 Eitarō Shindō as Kusaemon
 Kanae Kobayashi as nanny
 Fumihiko Yokoyama as book-keeper 1
 Jun Fujikawa as book-keeper 2
 Soji Shibata as book-keeper 3
 Inosuke Kuhara as boy
 Ayuko Fujishiro as waitress
 Shozo Nanbu as doctor
 Midori Komatsu as hostess
 Sachiko Aima as flower decoration teacher
 Sumao Ishihara as priest

References

External links
 
 

1951 films
1951 drama films
Japanese drama films
Japanese black-and-white films
Films based on short fiction
Films based on works by Jun'ichirō Tanizaki
Films directed by Kenji Mizoguchi
Daiei Film films
Films with screenplays by Yoshikata Yoda
Films scored by Fumio Hayasaka
Films produced by Masaichi Nagata
1950s Japanese films